J.D. Adams & Company was founded in 1885 by Joseph D Adams who invented the first leaning-wheel pull grader and was based in Indianapolis. The company manufactured construction machinery including sheepsfoot rollers, dozers and graders from its factory. The company catalogues also listed products by Acme Road Machinery Company though the association is unknown beyond the product listings. In 1955 LeTourneau-Westinghouse purchased J.D. Adams & Co and continued to operate under the name until 1960.

See also
 M. D. Moody & Sons, Inc.

References

Construction equipment manufacturers of the United States
1885 establishments in Indiana
Manufacturing companies based in Indianapolis
1960 disestablishments in the United States